Octave de Rochebrune (1824–1900) was a French painter, sculptor and etcher. He did 492 etchings, including etchings of the Château de Blois, the Château de Chambord and the Château de Vitré.

References

1824 births
1900 deaths
People from Fontenay-le-Comte
19th-century French painters
French sculptors
French etchers